Tammeküla is a village in Järva Parish, Järva County in central Estonia.

Educator, archeologist and historian Jaan Jung (1835–1900) and writer Ene Mihkelson (born 1944) were born in Tammeküla.

References

 

Villages in Järva County